

The Bristol Racing Biplane was a British single-seat biplane designed to combine the performance of a monoplane but using the strength of the biplane. It was designed by Robert Grandseigne and Léon Versepuy, who were supervised by George Challenger for the British & Colonial Aeroplane Company of Bristol, it crashed on its first flight.

Design and development
The Racing Biplane, also known as The Racer or Biplane No. 33 from its Bristol sequence number, was powered by a  Gnome engine driving a four-bladed tractor propeller. It had unequal span wings each with a single steel-tube spar. The rectangular fuselage was a composite structure of wood and steel tubes covered in fabric. It had a twin-skid steel-tube chassis fitted with two wheels on a rubber-sprung cross axle and also had a tail skid, the main skids were long enough to act as brakes on landing. The aircraft was displayed at Olympia in 1911 and was then taken to Larkhill in April 1911 where it was wrecked when it overturned attempting its first flight.

Specifications

References

Notes

Bibliography

1910s British civil aircraft
Racing Biplane
Single-engined tractor aircraft
Rotary-engined aircraft
Aircraft first flown in 1911